The 1997 UCI Road World Cup was the ninth edition of the UCI Road World Cup. It was won by Italian classics specialist Michele Bartoli of the  team.

Races

Final standings

Individual results

Team classification

References

Complete results from Cyclingbase.com
 Final classification for individuals and teams from memoire-du-cyclisme.eu

 
 
UCI Road World Cup (men)